thumb|right|Reynolda Gardens in spring

Reynolda Gardens are located off Reynolda Road, adjacent to the Reynolda campus of Wake Forest University and the Reynolda House in Winston-Salem, North Carolina. The gardens are open daily with free admission.

The gardens were originally part of a large country estate and farm (1067 acres) created by tobacco magnate R. J. Reynolds and his wife Katharine Smith Reynolds between 1906 and 1923. In 1913 the Lord & Burnham greenhouse was built to serve the family and farm, and to produce flowers commercially. Landscape architect Thomas W. Sears (1880–1966) designed the  formal garden for Mrs. Reynolds, starting in 1915. In a series of gifts from 1958 to 1962, their daughter Mary Reynolds Babcock established Reynolda Gardens by donating its property to the college.

In 1995 the college and the National Park Service performed extensive historic reconstruction to return the garden to its original design.

Today the gardens include  of woodlands, fields, wetlands, and a  formal garden with greenhouse. Two acres of the formal gardens comprise the Greenhouse Gardens (designed 1917, 1920, 1931) which centers around a sunken garden divided into four quadrants, with grass lawns, border plantings, rose gardens, theme gardens, specimen trees, and boxwood hedges, as well as tea-houses, fountains, and pergolas. The other half contains the Fruit, Cut Flower, and Nicer Vegetable Garden (1921), which grows vines, vegetables, climbing roses, and espaliered fruit trees.

The entire property also includes a 3/4-mile woodland trail, as well as a slightly longer perimeter trail (1.5 miles).

See also 
Reynolda Historic District
 List of botanical gardens in the United States

External links 
 Reynolda Gardens
 National Park Service information on Reynolda Gardens

Botanical gardens in North Carolina
Geography of Winston-Salem, North Carolina
Protected areas of Forsyth County, North Carolina
Tourist attractions in Winston-Salem, North Carolina